Colletes fulgidus is a species of hymenopteran in the family Colletidae. It is found in North America.

Subspecies
These two subspecies belong to the species Colletes fulgidus:
 Colletes fulgidus fulgidus Swenk, 1904
 Colletes fulgidus longiplumosus Stephen, 1954 (long-plumed cellophane bee)

References

Further reading

 

Colletidae
Articles created by Qbugbot
Insects described in 1904